Karl Kerschl is a Canadian comic book artist, best known for his work on DC Comics books, including Adventures of Superman, Majestic, All-Flash, Teen Titans: Year One and Gotham Academy.

Early life
Kerschl was born in Toronto and raised in Niagara Falls. He attended the Ontario College of Art for a year before deciding to practice on his own, discovering and improving his own storytelling and drawing styles in the process.

Career
Kerschl has worked on various series for DC Comics, including Adventures of Superman, Majestic, All-Flash #1 and Teen Titans: Year One.

On June 20, 2007 Kerschl began the weekly webcomic The Abominable Charles Christopher, which follows the adventures of a dim but gentle sasquatch-like creature and his forest friends who must defend their woods from threats by humans. It has been praised by critics, and has won a Joe Shuster Award in 2010, a nomination for an Eisner Award in 2010, and won an Eisner in 2011. It has been collected in two deluxe limited hardcover volumes.

Awards
 2010 Joe Shuster Award for Outstanding WebComic Creator/Creative Team
 2010 Eisner Award for Best Digital Comic (nominated)
 2011 Eisner Award for Best Digital Comic (won)

Personal life
Kerschl currently lives in Montreal, Quebec.

References

External links

 Official Website
 The Abominable Charles Christopher
 Interview featuring Karl Kerschl
 Kerschl interview at comicfoundry.com
 "The Abominable Charles Christopher"

Living people
Year of birth missing (living people)
Canadian comics artists
Canadian webcomic creators
Artists from Toronto
Joe Shuster Award winners for Outstanding WebComic Creator/Creative Team